Odhrán is an Irish language forename typically given to men. It can be spelled Oḋrán and is usually anglicised as Odhran (without fada), Or(r)an or Or(r)in. Odharnait is the feminine equivalent.

People

Odrán
 Odran (disciple of Saint Patrick), is referred to in Irish Literature as meaning the tall, dark-haired man, friend to St. Patrick.

Odhrán
 Odhrán Mac Niallais, Gaelic footballer
Odhran O'Dwyer, Gaelic footballer
Ódhrán Ua hEolais, 10th century scribe of Clonmacnoise monastery

Órán/Oran
Oran Milo Roberts, former governor of Texas
Oran McNulty, Irish rugby player
Oran McPherson, Canadian politician
O(d)ran of Iona, Irish Christian Saint

See also
 Irish name
 List of Irish given names
 Oran (disambiguation)
 Orin (disambiguation)